Jacobsson is a Swedish surname. Notable people with the surname include:

Anders Jacobsson and Sören Olsson, two Swedish-born cousins who are writers of children's literature and young-adult fiction
Emma Jacobsson (1883–1977), Austrian-born Swedish botanist, art historian, knitwear designer and entrepreneur
Frank Jacobsson (1930–2017), Swedish football winger
Jonas Jacobsson (born 1965), Swedish sport shooter who has won several gold medals at the Paralympic Games
Lars Jacobsson (born 1960), Swedish football manager and former player
Maj Jacobsson (1909–1996), Swedish athlete
Oscar Jacobsson (1889–1945), Swedish comic creator and cartoonist who started his career in 1918
Per Jacobsson (1894–1963), managing director of the International Monetary Fund 1956–1963
Selma Jacobsson (1841–1899), Swedish photographer
Skotte Jacobsson (1888–1964), Swedish track and field athlete who competed in the 1912 Summer Olympics
Sven Jacobsson (1914–1983), Swedish football midfielder
Ulla Jacobsson (1929–1982), Swedish actress, played one of the very few female roles in the film Zulu

See also 
Jacobson (surname)
Jakobson (surname)
Jakobsson
Jacobsen (surname)
Jacobs (surname)

Swedish-language surnames
Patronymic surnames
Surnames from given names